Abouzar Mohajer Mighani (born 19 May 1989) is an Iranian kabaddi player who currently plays for the Iran national kabaddi team and Bengal Warriors, in the Pro Kabaddi League.

Early life 
Abozar was a wrestler before pursuing kabaddi as a full-time profession. Owing to his performances for the national team, he was bought by the Gujarat Fortunegiants for Season 5 of the Pro Kabaddi League.

Playing style
Abozar is a multifaceted defender who plays as Right cover and Right Corner defender. He’s nicknamed the ‘Smiling Assassin’ for his ability to pin down skillful opposition raiders with relative ease.

Career

Season 5 

Abozar scored 66 tackle points in 24 matches in his debut season at a tackle strike rate of 56.03%. Abozar went on to deliver consistently for his side in his debut season and played a pivotal role for Gujrat Fortunegiants reaching the final in their debut season.

Season 6 

Abozar was snapped up by Telugu Titans for 76 lakhs for the sixth edition of VIVO Pro Kabaddi League. He followed up his consistent performances in his second season scoring 56 tackle points in 21 matches at a tackle strike rate of 57.14%.

Records and achievements
 Asian Games Gold (2018) 
 Asian Games Silver (2010)

References 

Iranian kabaddi players
1989 births
Living people
Pro Kabaddi League players
Asian Games medalists in kabaddi
Kabaddi players at the 2010 Asian Games
Kabaddi players at the 2018 Asian Games
Asian Games gold medalists for Iran
Asian Games silver medalists for Iran
Medalists at the 2010 Asian Games
Medalists at the 2018 Asian Games
21st-century Iranian people